Presidential elections were held in Guatemala on 22 February 1922. The result was a victory for José María Orellana, although the military had controlled the election and silenced the opposition, as well as putting down rebellions in at least twelve places including Antigua. Orellana assumed the presidency on 4 March.

Results

References

Bibliography
Díaz Romeu, Guillermo. “ Del régimen de Carlos Herrera a la elección de Jorge Ubico.” Historia general de Guatemala. 1993-1999. Guatemala: Asociación de Amigos del País, Fundación para la Cultura y el Desarrollo. Volume 5. 1996.

Presidential elections in Guatemala
Guatemala
1922 in Guatemala
Election and referendum articles with incomplete results